The Hour Before My Brother Dies is a 1986 Australian telemovie.

Plot
Sally visits her brother Martin in prison where he awaits execution for murder. During the visit, the two are quickly drawn back to a hot summer's New Year's Eve night of many years ago.

Production
The film was based on a 1986 play.

References

External links
Review at Prison movies

Australian television films
1986 television films
1986 films
Australian films based on plays
1980s English-language films